Gavin Fox is a Canadian actor, best known for his roles as Eduardo Garcia in the television series Connor Undercover, Dutch Balik in the film Kin, and Gared in the television series Killjoys.

His father David Fox, was also an actor.

In addition to his acting roles, Fox has also worked as a post-production assistant on various animated television series.

Acting career

References

External links

Living people
Year of birth missing (living people)
Canadian male television actors
Canadian male film actors
21st-century Canadian male actors